Aneesh Chaganty (born January 30, 1991) is an American film director and screenwriter. He made his feature film directorial debut with the 2018 thriller Searching, for which he won the Alfred P. Sloan Feature Film Prize at the 2018 Sundance Film Festival.

Early life and background
Aneesh Chaganty was born in Redmond, Washington, and grew up in San Jose, California. His parents, originally from Andhra Pradesh, India, moved to the U.S. in the 1980s. His father, who obtained an MS degree in computer engineering from Drexel University, serves as a director and Chief Technology Officer at a software publishing, consultancy and supply company founded by both his parents, AppEnsure Inc.

Chaganty attended Valley Christian High School from 2005 to 2009. He graduated from USC School of Cinematic Arts in 2013 with a degree in film and television production.

Film career
In 2014, Chaganty's two minute short film, a Google Glass spot called Seeds, became an internet sensation after garnering more than 1 million YouTube views in 24 hours. Following its success, Chaganty was invited to join the Google 5 team at Google Creative Lab in New York City, where he spent two years developing, writing and directing Google commercials.

After working on over 25 short films and videos, Chaganty directed his first feature film, Searching, which was originally pitched as a short film but was offered a production budget for a feature instead, was released on August 24, 2018 before opening wide on August 31, also premiering at the Sundance Film Festival on January 21, 2018.
 
Chaganty's second film Run, a thriller starring Sarah Paulson and Kiera Allen, was set to be released on January 24, 2020, then May 8, 2020, but was pushed back because of the COVID-19 pandemic, and was released on Hulu on November 20, 2020, and internationally by Netflix on April 2, 2021.

Filmography

Short films

Feature films

Acting credits

TV roles

Film roles

Awards and nominations

References

External links

The New York Times: Searching
The New York Times: Run

1991 births
American film directors of Indian descent
American male television actors
Living people
University of Southern California alumni
USC School of Cinematic Arts alumni
American male writers of Indian descent
Film directors from California
People from San Jose, California
American people of Telugu descent
Alfred P. Sloan Prize winners
American screenwriters of Indian descent
Screenwriters from California
American people of Indian descent
Indian filmmakers